Immortal Beloved is a 1951 West German drama film directed by Veit Harlan and starring Kristina Söderbaum, Hans Holt and Hermann Schomberg. It was shot at the Göttingen Studios with location shooting in Schleswig-Holstein. The film's sets were designed by the art director Walter Haag.

Cast
 Kristina Söderbaum as Katharina von Hollstein
 Hans Holt as Johannes S.
 Hermann Schomberg as Pfarrer Georg Bonnix
 Alexander Golling as Wulf von Hollstein
 Franz Schafheitlin as Talma
 Otto Gebühr as Dietrich
 Hedwig Wangel as Bas' Ursel
 Jakob Tiedtke as Wirt
 Erna Morena as Äbtissin
 Eduard Marks as Erzähler
 Tilo von Berlepsch as Kurt von der Risch
 Else Ehser as Trienke
 Robert Taube
 Eugen Dumont as Bauer Mahnke
 Günter Kind as Bruder des Johannes
 Wilhelm Meyer-Ottens as Bauer in der Waldschänke
 Peter Thomas
 Paul Weber

References

Bibliography 
 Bangert, Axel. The Nazi Past in Contemporary German Film: Viewing Experiences of Intimacy and Immersion. Boydell & Brewer,  2014.

External links 
 

1951 films
West German films
German drama films
1951 drama films
1950s German-language films
Films directed by Veit Harlan
Films based on short fiction
Films based on works by Theodor Storm
German black-and-white films
1950s German films
Films shot at Göttingen Studios